Leonard Dennis may refer to:

Leonard G. Dennis (died 1885), political figure
Lennie Dennis (born 1964), Jamaican footballer

See also